The House of Festetics (singular, not plural) or Feštetić in Croatian is the name of a historic noble family which dates back to 15th century and 1566 of Hungarian counts and princes of Croatian origin. A prominent family during the Austro-Hungarian Empire, they are mostly known for the baroque Festetics Palace and the Viennese prince Tasziló Festetics.

Counts Festetics of Tolna
On 8 August 1746, Josef and Kristof Festetics (the two sons of the second marriage of Paul Festetics) added de Tolna to their surname (von Tolna in Austria). On 5 November 1766, Josef's eldest son Pal Festetics de Tolna (1725–1782) was made a count by Queen Maria Theresa of Hungary. On 24 February 1772, Kristof's eldest son Pal Festetics de Tolna (1722–1782) was made a count by Queen Maria Theresa of Hungary, who was also Archduchess of Austria and Holy Roman Empress. The title of count was inheritable by all male-line descendants.

Princes Festetics of Tolna
On 21 June 1911, Count Tassilo Festetics de Tolna (1850–1933) was made a prince (Fürst) with the style Serene Highness (Durchlaucht) by King Francis Joseph I of Hungary. His grandson, prince Georg (born 1940) is the current head of the house and third Fürst.

Dutch nobility incorporation
In 1973, Count Dénes Festetics de Tolna (1943) was incorporated in the Dutch nobility with the title of count; the title of count(ess) is inheritable by all male-line descendants.

Notable members 
Among the other prominent members of the family are:
 Antal Festetics (born 1937), Austrian biologist
 Andor Festetics (1843–1930), Hungarian politician
 György Festetics (1815–1883), Hungarian politician
 Leo Festetics (1800–1884), Hungarian composer
 Sándor Festetics (1882–1956), Hungarian politician
 Tassilo Festetics de Tolna (1813-1883), Austrian general

Festetics/Feštetić may also refer to:
 the Feštetić Castle, located in Pribislavec, a village near Čakovec, Međimurje County, northern Croatia 
 the Festetics Palace, located in Keszthely, Hungary
 the Festetics String Quartet, from Budapest, Hungary

See also
List of titled noble families in the Kingdom of Hungary

Further reading 

  - the descendants of Lukács Festetics (died before 1637)

Timeline of feudal lords of Međimurje

 
Croatian noble families
Hungarian noble families
Families of the Habsburg monarchy